Moana Delle (born 7 March 1989 in Münster) is a German windsurfer. She finished 5th at the 2012 Summer Olympics in the sailboard class.

References

External links 
 
 
 
 
 

1989 births
Living people
German female sailors (sport)
Olympic sailors of Germany
Sailors at the 2012 Summer Olympics – RS:X
Sportspeople from Münster
German windsurfers
Female windsurfers